Allonemobius allardi, the Allard's ground cricket, is a species of ground crickets in the family Gryllidae. It is found in North America.

References

 Capinera J.L, Scott R.D., Walker T.J. (2004). Field Guide to Grasshoppers, Katydids, and Crickets of the United States. Cornell University Press.
 Otte, Daniel (1994). "Crickets (Grylloidea)". Orthoptera Species File 1, 120.

Further reading

 Arnett, Ross H. (2000). American Insects: A Handbook of the Insects of America North of Mexico. CRC Press.

External links

 NCBI Taxonomy Browser, Allonemobius allardi

Ensifera
Insects described in 1959